HMAS Geraldton (FCPB 213), named for the port city of Geraldton, Western Australia, was a  of the Royal Australian Navy (RAN).

Design and construction

Main propulsion machinery consisted of two MTU series 538 diesel engines, which supplied  to the two propeller shafts. Exhaust was not expelled through a funnel, like most ships, but through vents below the waterline. The ship's company consisted of 22 personnel. Each patrol boat was armed with a single Bofors 40mm gun as main armament, supplemented by two .50 cal Browning machineguns and an 81 mm mortar, although the mortar was removed from all ships sometime after 1988. The main weapon was originally to be two 30-mm guns on a twin-mount, but the reconditioned Bofors were selected to keep costs down; provision was made to install an updated weapon later in the class' service life, but this did not eventuate.

Geraldton was laid down by NQEA in Cairns, Queensland on 3 May 1982, launched on 22 October 1983, and commissioned into the RAN on 10 December 1983.

Fate
Geraldton was decommissioned on 7 October 2006. The patrol boat was broken up for scrap in Darwin during 2006 and 2007, at a cost of $450,000 to the Australian government.

Citations

References

 The chapter is available separately as Semaphore, Issue 17, 2005 in PDF and HTML formats.

Ships built in Queensland
Fremantle-class patrol boats
1983 ships